Hystricella echinulata is a species of air-breathing land snail, a terrestrial pulmonate gastropod mollusc in the family Geomitridae, the hairy snails and their allies. 

This species is endemic to Madeira, Portugal.

References

 Bank, R. A.; Neubert, E. (2017). Checklist of the land and freshwater Gastropoda of Europe. Last update: July 16th, 2017

External links
 Lowe, R. T. (1831). Primitiae faunae et florae Maderae et Portus Sancti; sive species quaedam novae vel hactenus minus rite cognitae animalium et plantarum in his insulis degentium breviter descriptae. Transactions of the Cambridge Philosophical Society. 4 (1): 1-70, pl. 1-6. Cambridge
 De Mattia, W., Neiber, M. T. & Groh, K. (2018). Revision of the genus-group Hystricella R. T. Lowe, 1855 from Porto Santo (Madeira Archipelago), with descriptions of new recent and fossil taxa (Gastropoda, Helicoidea, Geomitridae). ZooKeys. 732: 1-125

Endemic fauna of Madeira
Molluscs of Europe
Geomitridae
Taxonomy articles created by Polbot